The Eastern Zone was one of the three regional zones of the 1986 Davis Cup.

13 teams entered the Eastern Zone in total, with the winner promoted to the following year's World Group. South Korea defeated Japan in the final and qualified for the 1987 World Group.

Participating nations

Draw

First round

Singapore vs. Chinese Taipei

Malaysia vs. Hong Kong

Thailand vs. Bangladesh

Indonesia vs. Philippines

Pakistan vs. Sri Lanka

Quarterfinals

Japan vs. Chinese Taipei

Hong Kong vs. China

Thailand vs. Indonesia

South Korea vs. Pakistan

Semifinals

Japan vs. China

South Korea vs. Thailand

Final

South Korea vs. Japan

References

External links
Davis Cup official website

Davis Cup Asia/Oceania Zone
Eastern Zone